McCarthyville is an extinct town in Flathead County, in the U.S. state of Montana.

History
McCarthyville was platted in 1890 by Eugene McCarthy, and named for him. At its peak, McCarthyville held 1,000 inhabitants and 32 bars, and was plagued with violence.

References

Geography of Flathead County, Montana
Ghost towns in Montana